The  2011–12 season was the 86th season of competitive football by Universitatea Cluj.

Players

Current squad
As of 10 June 2011.

Squad changes

In

Out

Player statistics

Appearances and goals
Last updated on 24 July 2011.

|}

Liga I

League table

Results by round

Points by opponent

Competitive

Liga I
Kickoff times are in EET.

Results

FC Universitatea Cluj seasons
Universitatea Cluj